José Serra Gil (23 December 1923 – 12 June 2002) was a Spanish racing cyclist. He rode in the 1949 Tour de France.

Major results

1947
 5th Trofeo Jaumendreu
 10th Overall Volta a Catalunya
1948
 2nd Overall Volta a Tarragona
 4th Overall Vuelta a Levante
 6th Overall Volta a Catalunya
1st Stage 6
1949
 1st GP Pascuas
 1st Stage 3 Gran Premio Cataluña
 2nd Subida a Arrate
 7th Overall Volta a Catalunya
1950
 2nd Overall Volta a Catalunya
1st Stage 9
 2nd Overall Vuelta a Castilla
 3rd Overall Vuelta a España
1st Stages 10 & 19
 5th Overall Volta a Portugal
1st Prologue
1951
 4th Overall Volta a Catalunya
1952
 2nd Overall Vuelta a Castilla
 3rd Overall Volta a Catalunya
1953
 3rd Overall Volta a Catalunya
1st Stage 4b (ITT)
 7th Overall Critérium du Dauphiné Libéré
1954
 1st Overall Euskal Bizikleta
 6th Overall Volta a Catalunya
1st Stage 1
1955
 3rd Road race, National Road Championships
 7th Overall Vuelta a España
1956
 9th Overall Vuelta a España

References

External links
 

1923 births
2002 deaths
Spanish male cyclists
People from Montsià
Sportspeople from the Province of Tarragona
Spanish Vuelta a España stage winners
Cyclists from Catalonia
20th-century Spanish people